Jens Stoud (1713-1768) was a Norwegian government official.  He served as the County Governor of Lister og Mandal county from 1745 until 1768.

References

1713 births
1768 deaths
County governors of Norway